Psychobitches is a Sky Arts British sketch comedy show directed by Jeremy Dyson, in which famous women from history and fiction seek help from a psychologist (played by Rebecca Front).

Broadcast history 
Psychobitches was originally aired as a one-off pilot in 2012, as part of the Sky Arts Playhouse Presents self-contained TV plays. The pilot was originally aired on 21 June 2012 as episode 11 of series one of Playhouse Presents and lasted 30 minutes.

After the successful pilot, a five-part series was released in 2013 during series two of Playhouse Presents (episodes 7, 9, 11, 13 and 14).

Following the success of the first series, a full six-episode series was commissioned by Sky Arts as its own entity and was aired from 25 November 2014 with a double bill.

Regular cast
Rebecca Front as The Therapist
Sharon Horgan as various roles
Samantha Spiro as various roles
Frances Barber as various roles
Selina Griffiths as various roles
Katy Brand as various roles
Morgana Robinson as various roles
Seb Cardinal as various roles
Dustin Demri-Burns as various roles
Julia Davis as various roles
Michelle Gomez as various roles
Catherine Tate as various roles

Episodes

Pilot (2012) as part of Playhouse Presents

Series 1 (2013) as part of Playhouse Presents

Series 2 (2014)

References

External links 

2012 British television series debuts
2014 British television series endings
2010s British television sketch shows
British comedy television shows
British television sketch shows
Sky UK original programming
Television series by Endemol
Television series by Tiger Aspect Productions
English-language television shows